was a village located in Chiisagata District, Nagano Prefecture, Japan.

As of 2003, the village had an estimated population of 4,148 and a density of 47.31 persons per km². The total area was 87.67 km².

On March 6, 2006, Takeshi, along with the old city of Ueda, and the towns of Maruko and Sanada (all from Chiisagata District), to create the new and expanded city of Ueda.

External links
Official website of Ueda 

Dissolved municipalities of Nagano Prefecture
Ueda, Nagano